Rajeev Bindal is fifth consecutive term member of the HP legislative assembly. He was President of Himachal Pradesh BJP and speaker of Himachal Pradesh Vidhan Sabha. He is member of the Bharatiya Janata Party. Bindal was a minister of health and family welfare in Government of Himachal Pradesh, India.

Bindal is the son of the late Vaid Balmukund Bindal; born on 12 January 1955 at Solan. He is a fifth term MLA, presently from Nahan. He represented Solan constituency in Vidhan Sabha three times consecutively from 2000 - 2012. He was cabinet minister for health and family welfare in Himachal Pradesh Government from 2007 to 2012. He was unanimously elected as speaker of HP legislative assembly on January 10, 2018 at the inaugural session of 13th Vidhan Sabha in Dharamshala, Himachal Pradesh.

He is a doctor by profession. Bindal started social service right from his college days. After graduation, he went to tribal areas of Bihar to serve as a doctor for three years. He established Himgiri Kalyan Ashram at Solan, a charitable institution where poor children are provided boarding and education free of cost.

Bindal has held the office of Chairperson of Municipal Committee of Solan from 1995 to 2000. He was elected MLA in 2000 and became the Chairman of HP State Pollution Control Board. He was re-elected as MLA in 2003 and 2007 from Solan. He joined the state cabinet as Minister for Health & Family Welfare from 2007 - 2012. After the Solan constituency got reserved, he contested elections from Nahan in Sirmaur district and got elected consecutively two times. He became the Speaker of Himachal Pradesh legislative assembly, and occupied the constitutional post on January 10, 2018. He was the Health Minister in 2017 to 2019.

He spent two years as Speaker, and then moved to organisation by becoming the state president of BJP in January 2020.

In recent elections of state assembly 2022 he lost to the opposition leader of the party Indian national congress Sh. Ajay Solanki by a small margin.

He is a great politician and has great problem solving ability..He has done various good works for the town of Nahan and its people. In the 2010s the people of Nahan were facing a water crisis.
People have to spend money on water tankers to meet their water needs. But after Dr. Rajeev Bindal came into power he solved this problem by installing big water pipes that come all the way from the area of Jamta. 

Dr. Rajeev Bindal also repaired the roads of the township of Nahan and the small villages in the outskirts of Nahan.

References

People from Solan
Living people
1955 births
State cabinet ministers of Himachal Pradesh
Himachal Pradesh MLAs 2007–2012
Himachal Pradesh MLAs 2012–2017
Bharatiya Janata Party politicians from Himachal Pradesh
Himachal Pradesh MLAs 2017–2022
Indians imprisoned during the Emergency (India)
Speakers of the Himachal Pradesh Legislative Assembly
Himachal Pradesh MLAs 1998–2003
Himachal Pradesh MLAs 2003–2007